Washington Township is an inactive township in Monroe County, in the U.S. state of Missouri.

Washington Township was established in 1833, taking its name from President George Washington.

References

Townships in Missouri
Townships in Monroe County, Missouri